Patrik Baboumian (born 1 July 1979) is an Iranian-born German-Armenian retired strongman and former bodybuilder. He promotes veganism.

Early life
Baboumian was born on 1 July 1979 in Abadan, the son of Armenian parents. He emigrated to Germany with his mother and grandmother at the age of seven. By the age of nine, he had developed an interest in weight training, which led him to pursue bodybuilding.

Career
In 1999, Baboumian won the IFBB German Junior Bodybuilding Championship, and in 2002 he became the Overall Junior Champion at the Gießen Campions-Cup. Baboumian held the world log lift record in the 105 kg category , as well as the German heavyweight loglift record 180 kg (396 pounds) and the title of "Strongest Man of Germany" (105 kg division). Since 2006, he has been competing at IFSA Strongman events. In 2007, Baboumian competed at the FSA −105 kg World Championships and ended up in 14th place. 

Baboumian lifted  in his second attempt in the 2009 German log lift nationals. The next year, he set a new German heavyweight log lifting record with 180 kg (396 pounds). On 21 May 2011, he lifted  in Finland, winning the local competition. He also won "Germany's Strongest Man" in 2011 by winning the open division at the German strongman nationals.

In 2017, Baboumian featured in the documentary "Empathy" directed by Ed Antoja and that aims to promote a more respectful way of life towards all animals.

In 2018, Baboumian featured in the Netflix documentary "The Game Changers" directed by Louie Psihoyos, a film that explores nutritional science and showcases elite athletes who only consume plant-based diets.

In 2022, Baboumian featured in a song and music video called "Strongest Of The Strong" by Kreator, who added thundering backing vocals to the song and appeared in the music video for the song as the comic book character Earthraiser who's fighting for animals and nature.

Personal life
Baboumian has been a vegetarian since 2005 and became a vegan in 2011.
In November 2011, he became the new face of a campaign by the animal rights organization PETA, advocating a vegan diet.

Accomplishments 
1999 int. German Champion Jun. Bodybuilding—IFBB
2007 German Champion −105 kg Strongman—GFSA
2009 German Champion −105 kg Strongman—GFSA
2009 German Team-Champion Strongman—GFSA
2009 German Champion log lift—GFSA
2009 World record log lift—105 kg 
2010 German Champion log lift—GFSA
2010 German record in log lift +105 kg 
2011 4th place at loglifting worldcup 
2011 German record in loglifting +105 kg 
2011 German Champion and total winner in log lifting—GFSA 180 kg(396 pounds)
2011 German record in beer keg lifting (13 repeats)
2011 Germany's Strongest Man
2012 European Champion in Powerlifting Class—140 kg division (GPA)
2012 World record beer keg lifting 
2012 World record Front Hold 20 kg (1:26,14 Minuten)
2015 Veg Fest yoke-walk,  in 28 seconds

See also 
 List of vegans
 Veganism

References

External links 

1979 births
German activists
German bodybuilders
German male athletes
German male weightlifters
German people of Armenian descent
German powerlifters
German strength athletes
German veganism activists
Iranian bodybuilders
Iranian emigrants to Germany
Iranian people of Armenian descent
Living people
People from Abadan, Iran
Sports world record holders